Dacrydium nausoriense is a species of conifer in the family Podocarpaceae. It is endemic to Fiji, where it is only known from one subpopulation on each of the two main islands, Viti Levu and Vanua Levu. It is a valuable timber tree which has been overharvested. This overexploitation and habitat loss are the main threats to this endangered species.

References

nausoriense
Endangered plants
Endemic flora of Fiji
Taxonomy articles created by Polbot
Taxa named by David John de Laubenfels